Helpmekaar is a village 26 km south-east of Dundee. Afrikaans for 'help each other', the name is derived from transport riders having had to assist each other in making a road over a nearby hill.

References

Populated places in the Msinga Local Municipality